Krisztián Lisztes (born 2 July 1976) is a Hungarian former professional footballer who played as a central midfielder. He is most commonly known for his stints at VfB Stuttgart and Werder Bremen in the Bundesliga, and for Ferencvárosi TC (three separate spells) in his home country.

Club career
Born in Budapest, Lisztes began his professional career as a midfielder, playing for the Hungarian team Ferencvárosi TC, where he was brought up through the youth academy. He was considered by many as one of the biggest talents of Hungarian football. He became a member of the first team in 1993 at the age of 17, when he had to replace Hungary's then probably biggest star Lajos Détári on a quick note when Détári was transferred to Italy.

He led Ferencvaros to the group stages of the UEFA Champions League in 1995, making them the first Hungarian team to get there. Scoring the first goal against Grasshoppers in a 3–0 victory, he also became the first ever Hungarian player to score in the Champions League group stages.

His performances at the European level caught the attention of several big clubs and he would go on to join VfB Stuttgart in 1996. Many considered this move as premature as Stuttgart's then playmaker Bulgarian Krasimir Balakov had a solid place in the team, and Lisztes indeed had to spend some time on the reserves bench, but later he became a regular in the team, and played there till 2001 before moving to Werder Bremen. His successes include DFB-Pokal triumphs with Stuttgart in 1997 and Werder in 2004, as well as the 2004 league title with Werder.

In 2004, he sustained an injury and never fully regained his fitness at Werder. In 2005, following trials with Wigan Athletic of the Premier League and A.C. ChievoVerona of the Serie A, he joined Borussia Mönchengladbach, but failed to make a serious impact as a result of his continued injury problems. After a brief spell in Croatia with Hajduk Split he rejoined his childhood team Ferencvárosi TC in February 2008, but moved on to REAC only after a few months. On 3 August 2008 he scored his first goal in the Hungarian premier league after 12 years.

On 12 January 2009, he left REAC and joined F.C. Hansa Rostock on a free transfer and signed a contract till 30 June 2009. He left Rostock after his contract ended, and on 24 June 2009 signed for Paksi SE.

International career
In 1994, Lisztes debuted in the Hungary national team where to this day he gained 49 caps and scored 9 goals. He was last capped in 2004.

During the 1995–96 season, he was a member of the Hungary Olympic Football team, which won qualification to the 1996 Summer Olympics in Atlanta. Hungary lost all of their three group matches on the Olympics, their opponent including future gold medal winners Nigeria, and Brazil with the likes of Dida, Ronaldo, Rivaldo, Roberto Carlos and Juninho Paulista in their squad. This was the last occasion to this day, when the Hungary football team managed to qualify for the Olympics.

Personal life
He is married and has a daughter and a son. His son, Krisztián Lisztes Jr is also a professional footballer.

Career statistics

Club

International goals
Scores and results list Hungary's goal tally first, score column indicates score after each Lisztes goal.

Honours
Ferencváros
 Nemzeti Bajnokság I: 1994–95, 1995–96
 Magyar Kupa: 1995-96, 1994-95
 Szuperkupa: 1993, 1994, 1995

VfB Stuttgart
 DFB-Pokal: 1996–97
 UEFA Cup Winners' Cup: runners-up 1997–98
 UEFA Intertoto Cup: 2000

Werder Bremen
 Bundesliga: 2003–04
 DFB-Pokal: 2003–04

Paksi SE
 Ligakupa: runners-up 2009–10

Individual
 Hungarian Footballer of the Year: 2002

References

1976 births
Living people
Footballers from Budapest
Hungarian footballers
Association football midfielders
Hungary international footballers
Hungary under-21 international footballers
Olympic footballers of Hungary
Footballers at the 1996 Summer Olympics
Nemzeti Bajnokság I players
Ferencvárosi TC footballers
Bundesliga players
2. Bundesliga players
VfB Stuttgart players
SV Werder Bremen players
Borussia Mönchengladbach players
HNK Hajduk Split players
FC Hansa Rostock players
Rákospalotai EAC footballers
Paksi FC players
Vasas SC players
Szeged-Csanád Grosics Akadémia footballers
Hungarian expatriate footballers
Expatriate footballers in Germany
Expatriate footballers in Croatia
Hungarian expatriate sportspeople in Germany
Hungarian expatriate sportspeople in Croatia